The Durg–Jagadalpur Express is an Express train belonging to South East Central Railway zone that runs between  and  in India. It is currently being operated with 18211/18212 train numbers on tri-weekly basis.

Service

Route and halts 

The important halts of the train are:

Coach composition

The train has standard ICF rakes with a max speed of 110 kmph. The train consists of 10 coaches:

 1 Sleeper coaches
 7 General Unreserved
 2 Seating cum Luggage Rake

Traction

Both trains are hauled by a Raipur Loco Shed-based WDM-3A diesel locomotive from Durg to Jagdalpur and vice versa.

Direction reversal

The train reverses its direction 2 times:

See also 

 Durg Junction railway station
 Jagdalpur railway station

Notes

References

External links 

 18211/Durg–Jagdalpur Express India Rail Info
 18212/Jagdalpur–Durg Express India Rail Info

Transport in Durg
Express trains in India
Rail transport in Chhattisgarh
Rail transport in Odisha
Railway services introduced in 2012
2012 establishments in Chhattisgarh